The Argentine National Road Race Championships is a cycling race where the Argentine cyclists compete to decide who will become champion for the year to come.

Men

Elite

U23

Junior

Women

Elite

See also
Argentine National Time Trial Championships
National Road Cycling Championships

References

National road cycling championships
Cycle races in Argentina
Cycling